Crest Park is an unincorporated community in San Bernardino County, California, United States. Crest Park had a post office with ZIP code 92326, which opened in 1949.

References

San Bernardino Mountains
Unincorporated communities in San Bernardino County, California
Unincorporated communities in California